Combat Zones That See, or CTS, is a project of the United States Defense Advanced Research Projects Agency (DARPA) whose goal is to "track everything that moves" in a city by linking up a massive network of surveillance cameras to a centralized computer system. Artificial intelligence software will then identify and track all vehicle movement throughout the city.

CTS is described by DARPA as intended for use in combat zones, to deter enemy attacks on United States troops and to identify and track enemy combatants who launch attacks against U.S. soldiers.

Civil liberties activists and writers of dystopian fiction believe that such programs have great potential for privacy violations, and have openly opposed the project.

See also
Information Awareness Office
Surveillance
VIRAT
Heterogenous Aerial Reconnaissance Team
Closed-circuit television
Cognitive Technology Threat Warning System

References

External links
DARPA BAA 03-15 official project description and bid solicitation

DARPA
Military equipment of the United States
Surveillance
Research projects